Calgan Marine was a Canadian boat builder that had its factory on Crown Street in North Vancouver. The company specialized in the design and manufacture of fiberglass sailboats.

The company was founded by Al Nairne in 1962 and ceased operations in 1979.

History
Nairne saw a Cal 20 sailboat, built by Cal Yachts, while on a visit to California and convinced Jack Jensen of Jensen Marine to allow him to produce the boats under licence in Canada. The first design produced was the Cal 20, introduced  in 1961.

During its 17 years in business, Calgan produced 300 examples of Cal Yachts designs. The company also developed its own designs, including the Crown 28, based on the Cal 2-27.

Boats 

Summary of boats built by Calgan Marine:

Cal 20 - 1961
Cal 28 - 1963
Cal 25 - 1965
Crown 23 - 1969
Calgan 23 - 1970
Cal 29 - 1971
Crown 34 - 1975
Crown 28 - 1976

See also
List of sailboat designers and manufacturers

References

Calgan Marine